Scoparia caliginosa is a species of moth in the family Crambidae. It is endemic to New Zealand.

Taxonomy
This species was described by Alfred Philpott in 1918. However the placement of this species within the genus Scoparia is in doubt. As a result, this species has also been referred to as Scoparia (s.l.) caliginosa.

Description
The forewings are ferruginous brown, sprinkled with whitish on the basal three-fourths. There is a short brown fascia from the costa at the base and the first line is paler and margined with ferruginous brown posteriorly. The second line is whitish, margined with ferruginous brown anteriorly. The hindwings are fuscous grey, but darker terminally.

References

Moths described in 1918
Moths of New Zealand
Scorparia
Endemic fauna of New Zealand
Endemic moths of New Zealand